There are at least 17 named lakes and reservoirs in Columbia County, Arkansas.

Lakes
According to the United States Geological Survey, there are no named lakes in Columbia County.

Reservoirs
 Arkansas Louisiana Gas Lake, el.  
 Bearden Lake, el.  
 Byrd Lake, el.  
 Dupriest Lake, el.  
 Fallin Lake, el.  
 Fincher Lake, el.  
 Foster Lake, el.  
 Lake Columbia, el.  
 Lake Sue, el.  
 Maloch Lake, el.  
 Miller Lake, el.  
 Pittman Lake, el.  
 Powell Lake, el.  
 Rasberry Lake, el.  
 Sale Lake, el.  
 Weber Lake, el.  
 Wilson Lake, el.

See also
 List of lakes in Arkansas

Notes

Bodies of water of Columbia County, Arkansas
Columbia